Robert Pospíšil (born December 27, 1977) is a Czech former professional ice hockey defenceman.

Pospisil played in the Czech Extraliga for HC Pardubice between 1996 and 2000 and HC Bílí Tygři Liberec during the 2002-03 season. He also played in the Ligue Magnus for Dauphins d'Épinal, the Polska Hokej Liga for Podhale Nowy Targ and Stoczniowiec Gdańsk and the Elite Ice Hockey League for the Basingstoke Bison.

Career statistics

References

External links

1977 births
Living people
Basingstoke Bison players
HC Bílí Tygři Liberec players
Czech ice hockey defencemen
Dauphins d'Épinal players
HC Dukla Jihlava players
HC Dynamo Pardubice players
Gazprom-OGU Orenburg players
SK Horácká Slavia Třebíč players
LHK Jestřábi Prostějov players
EC Kapfenberg players
HC Kometa Brno players
Podhale Nowy Targ players
HC Slovan Ústečtí Lvi players
Sportspeople from Pardubice
Stoczniowiec Gdańsk players
Czech expatriate ice hockey players in Russia
Czech expatriate sportspeople in Poland
Czech expatriate sportspeople in England
Czech expatriate sportspeople in Austria
Czech expatriate sportspeople in France
Expatriate ice hockey players in Austria
Expatriate ice hockey players in England
Expatriate ice hockey players in France
Expatriate ice hockey players in Poland